An  (Hindustani:  or ) is a traditional brazier used for space-heating and cooking in the northern areas of  South Asia, mainly in India, Pakistan and Nepal.  usually generate heat from burning coal and, when in use, have glowing coal or charcoal pieces but few or no flames.

Kanger
A smaller, and more decorative, version of the  called the kanger or kangri is employed for personal use in Kashmir.

Hazards
Despite public health warnings,  are often used in enclosed spaces to maximize heating, resulting in deaths from carbon monoxide poisoning in the region.

See also

Air-tight stove
Brazier
Bukhari (heater)
Franklin stove
Hibachi - Japanese traditional heater
Kanger
Rocket stove
Space heater
Wood-burning stove

References

Burners
Heaters
Residential heating
Pakistani cuisine
Indian cuisine